Harry Horowitz ( – April 13, 1914), also known as "Gyp the Blood", was an American underworld figure and a leader of the Lenox Avenue Gang in New York City.

Early life and career
Harry Horowitz was born on the Lower East Side of Manhattan  to Orthodox Jewish parents. He was a slight figure, standing just under  and weighing . but extraordinarily strong. He bragged that to win a $2 bet, he had broken a man's back in three places. He served prison terms for burglary and robbery.

New York City Judge Franklin C. Hoyt later recalled:

Rosenthal murder

On July 16, 1912, he and three accomplices murdered bookmaker Herman Rosenthal outside the Hotel Metropole. The four shot Rosenthal to death. Two of the killers, Jacob Seidenshner (aka "Whitey Lewis"), and Francisco "Frank" Cirofici (aka "Dago Frank") were arrested immediately after the killing, along with Charles Becker, a detective from the New York Police Department who was suspected of being a business partner of Rosenthal, but Horowitz and the fourth gunman, "Lefty" Louis Rosenberg, were not. There was a massive hunt for the missing two, who were found and arrested on September 14, 1912 in an apartment in Glendale, Queens, where they had been hiding for months.

During the trial, the three defendants claimed Rosenthal was murdered by someone known only as Itsky. Defense attorney Charles G.F. Wahle said Horowitz was no saint but was not guilty, telling the jury: "He has never been known as Gyp the Blood, but only as Gyp. He is the victim of evil companions. He is a cheat and a sharper and has been convicted as such. It would be futile for us to deny this, but he is not a murderer."

Horowitz, Rosenberg, Seidenshner and Cirofici were convicted in November 1912 and sentenced to death. There were rumors that an attempt to rescue the criminals would be made during their transfer to Sing Sing Prison after the trial. Sheriff Julius Harburger, responsible for transporting the prisoners, received a number of anonymous notes, and one stated:

Sheriff Harburger—watch out when you take Gyp and his gang up the long steps at Ossining. Kitty the Second and his bunch will be there hiding in the rocks to shoot you up and rescue them. A WELL-WISHER.

Their case before the New York Court of Appeals was denied in February 1914, but Becker was granted a new trial. They produced additional witnesses on April 11, 1914, who swore to their innocence, but New York Supreme Court Justice Goff did not find them credible.

Horowitz gave a last statement to the press on April 13, 1914, stating:

We all knew that the result was decided against us just as soon as we heard Justice Goff was in the case. We had given up expecting mercy either from Justice Goff or District Attorney Whitman.

Two hours before the execution, Cirofici gave a statement admitting he lied on the stand during the trial. Cirofici made the statement in the presence of the warden, the superintendent of the State Prison Department, and his mother and sister, regarding Rosenthal's murder. He stated that he was not present during the murder, but that it was committed by Rosenberg, Horowitz and informant Harry Vallon, who testified for the state during the trial.

On April 13, 1914, Horowitz was put to death in the electric chair, along with Rosenberg, Seidenshner and Cirofici. The next year, Becker also was executed for his part in the murder.

In popular culture

Set No. 2 for chamber orchestra (K. 1C32, 1912) by American composer Charles Ives included a piece titled "'Gyp the Blood' or Hearst!? Which Is worst?!," inviting a comparison between the gangster and publishing magnate William Randolph Hearst. Blues singer Richard "Rabbit" Brown wrote a song called "Gyp The Blood", which appears to be based on him. A character nicknamed Gyp the Blood appears in a book by Kevin Baker, where a fictionalized version of events from Harry Horowitz's life play out. He was mentioned in a 1926 W.C. Fields movie "It's the Old Army Game".
In the same year, he appears in the preface of the novel Psmith, Journalist by P.G. Wodehouse. He also is mentioned in the Tom Waits song "Down There by the Train"."

References

Further reading
Dash, Mike. Satan's Circus: Murder, Vice, Police Corruption and New York's Trial of the Century, Crown, New York, 2006
Gustavus, Myers. The History of Tammany Hall. New York: Boni & Liveright, 1917.
Joselit, Jenna Weissman. Our Gang: Jewish Crime and the New York Jewish Community, 1900-1940. Bloomington: Indiana University Press, 1983. 
Katcher, Leo. The Big Bankroll: The Life and Times of Arnold Rothstein. New York: Da Capo Press, 1994. 
Kohn, George C. Dictionary of Culprits and Criminals. Metuchen, New Jersey: Scarecrow Press, 1986.
Lardner, James and Thomas Reppetto. NYPD: A City and Its Police. New York: Henry Holt & Co., 2000. 
Pietrusza, David. Rothstein: The Life, Times, and Murder of the Criminal Genius Who Fixed the 1919 World Series. New York: Carroll & Graf Publishers, 2003. 
Reeve, Arthur Benjamin. The Golden Age of Crime. New York: Mohawk Press, 1937.
Tosches, Nick. King of the Jews: The Greatest Mob Story Never Told. New York: Harper Perennial, 2006.

External links

The "Killer Cop" and the Tombs

1880s births
1914 deaths
Date of birth unknown
Jewish American gangsters
American people convicted of murder
People executed for murder
Executed gangsters
20th-century executions by New York (state)
Gang members of New York City
People executed by New York (state) by electric chair
20th-century executions of American people
People convicted of murder by New York (state)
Rosenthal murder case
Lenox Avenue Gang
Burials at Mount Zion Cemetery (New York City)